Gerald E. Frug (born 1939) is an American legal scholar. He is the Louis D. Brandeis Professor of Law emeritus at Harvard Law School, and a leading academic authority on local government law.  He was married to feminist law professor Mary Joe Frug, who was murdered in 1991.

Frug has advocated regional cooperation to solve local government problems.  

He graduated from University of California, Berkeley and Harvard Law School and previously worked for the City of New York and the Equal Employment Opportunity Commission.

Publications
Barron, David J., and Gerald E. Frug.  City Bound: How States Stifle Urban Innovation (Cornell University Press 2009).
Barron, David, Gerald E. Frug & Rick Su. Dispelling the Myth of Home Rule: Local Power in Greater Boston (Rappaport Institute for Greater Boston 1st ed. 2004).
Frug, Gerald E. "Is Secession from the City of Los Angeles a Good Idea?" 49 University of California - Los Angeles Law Review 1783 (2002).
Frug, Gerald E. City Making: Building Communities without Building Walls (Princeton University Press 1999).
Frug, Gerald E. "City Services," 73 New York University Law Review 23 (1998).(Reprinted in 30 Land Use and Environmental Law, 1999)
Frug, Gerald E. Local Government Law (West Publishing 2nd ed. 1994).
Frug, Gerald E. "Administrative Democracy," 40 Toronto Law Journal 240 (1990).(Reprinted in D. Rosenbloom and R. Schwartz eds., Handbook on Regulation and Administrative Law 519, 1994; and in Bill Jenkins and Edward C. Page eds., the Foundations of Bureaucracy in Economic and Social Thought, 2004)

References

External links
Gerald Frug's Harvard Law Website
Democracy and the Rule of Law: Reflections on Gerald Frug
Renovating Digital Education (using Professor Frug's November 2007 lecture from the Urban Age Conference in Mumbai as context to critique CNBC's "Business of Innovation: Reshaping Cities")

1939 births
Living people
Harvard Law School faculty
Harvard Law School alumni
University of California, Berkeley alumni
American legal scholars